Zhangxi may refer to the following locations in China:

 Zhangxi, Dongzhi County (张溪镇), town in Anhui
 Zhangxi, Raoping County (樟溪镇), town in Guangdong
 Zhangxi Township (樟溪乡), Songyang County, Zhejiang